Count Redmond Garrett Prendiville (11 September 1900 – 28 June 1968) a former Australian metropolitan bishop, was the fifth bishop and second Roman Catholic Archbishop of the Archdiocese of Perth. In 1933, at the time of his consecration, aged 32, Prendiville was reputedly the youngest-ever Catholic archbishop.

Education
Prendiville began his studies for the priesthood 1918, getting himself expelled for playing cards from All Hallows College, Dublin, on the night before a retreat. He studied philosophy and history at University College Dublin (B.A., 1922, National University of Ireland), and theology at St Peter's College, Wexford (1921–25).

Career 
Selected for the Kerry Gaelic football team in 1924, Mundy, as Redmond was called, played in the 1924 All-Ireland Senior Football Championship Final and was named 'man of the match'. He was ordained priest at St. Kieran's College, Kilkenny, on 11 June 1925.

He emigrated to Perth in 1925 and was appointed to the cathedral parish of St. Mary's. In 1929, he was appointed administrator of the Cathedral parish.

Archbishop of Perth
On 22 October 1933, after only eight years as a priest, Prendiville was consecrated titular Archbishop of Cypsela and coadjutor Archbishop of Perth.  In 1935 he succeeded Archbishop Patrick Clune as fifth bishop and second archbishop of Perth. He was named bishop assistant at the Papal throne and Count of the Holy See in 1958.

Prendiville was also responsible for establishing up St Thomas More College at the University of Western Australia which was officially opened in 1957.

Personal life 
He suffered two strokes in 1946 and was frequently admitted to hospital over the ensuing years. He suffered an aortic lesion and died of a cerebrovascular accident on 28 June 1968 at St John of God Hospital, Subiaco; following a requiem Mass at St Mary's Cathedral, he was buried in Karrakatta Cemetery. He was exhumed in 2009 and reinterred in the crypt of St Mary's Cathedral, Perth, on 5 December 2009.

Legacy 
Prendiville Catholic College in Ocean Reef Western Australia is named after the Archbishop.

See also
Catholic bishops and archbishops of Perth, Western Australia

References

Further reading

Archbishop Redmond Prendiville - obituary - 1900–1968. Record (Perth, W.A.), No. 3352 (4 July 1968)

External links
 St Thomas More college website

1900 births
1968 deaths
Papal counts
Clergy from County Kerry
Kerry inter-county Gaelic footballers
Alumni of University College Dublin
Aquinas College, Perth
Burials at Karrakatta Cemetery
Irish emigrants to Australia
People from Perth, Western Australia
Roman Catholic archbishops of Perth
Participants in the Second Vatican Council
20th-century Roman Catholic archbishops in Australia
People educated at St Peter's College, Wexford
Irish expatriate Roman Catholic archbishops